Mallabula is a primarily residential suburb of the Port Stephens local government area in the Hunter Region of New South Wales, Australia. It is located on the Tilligerry Peninsula between Lemon Tree Passage and Tanilba Bay. The origin of the name may mean "three swamps" in the local Aboriginal language.

Geography
Mallabula is a low-lying suburb, almost at sea level. It is bisected by Lemon Tree Passage Road, which stretches for the full length of the peninsula, from Salt Ash in the south-west, to Lemon Tree Passage. In the northern part of the suburb is a small subdivision covering  on the banks of Tanilba Bay.

The beach consists mainly of sand flats that are exposed at low tide and almost completely covered at high tide preventing the beach from being useful as either a swimming or surfing beach. Near Rookes Point, at the mouth of Tanilba Bay, the land rises to a height of  AMSL. However, between these two points and throughout the remainder of the suburb the land is generally no more than  AMSL and is predominantly sandy.

The land south of Lemon Tree Passage Road is generally uninhabited, occupied only by a handful of homes in a single cul-de-sac and a sewage treatment plant.

Demographics
At the 2011 census Mallabula had a population of 851. Almost all of the population resides in a small, residential subdivision occupying only 18.5% of the entire suburb. The remaining population resides in four homes in a single cul-de-sac south of Tanilba Bay and is accounted for in the ABS population data for that suburb.

Facilities 
There is a sports ground called Mallabula Sports Complex which has five fields, athletics field, tennis courts, netball courts, canteens, toilets, meeting room and car parking. On 1195 Lemon Tree Passage Road is Mallabula Community Centre which provides tables, chairs and a kitchen. Tilligerry Aquatic Centre is a 8 lane heated 25-metre swimming pool which offers swimming lessons and aqua aerobics.

Notes

References

Suburbs of Port Stephens Council
Beaches of New South Wales